The 1996–97 season was the 98th season of competitive league football in the history of English football club Wolverhampton Wanderers. They played the season in the second tier of the English football system, the Football League First Division.

The team finished in third position in the league, their highest position in the football pyramid since their relegation from the top flight in 1983–84. Nonetheless, the season ended in disappointment for the club as they lost in the semi-finals of the play-offs to Crystal Palace, thereby failing to reach the Premier League.

Their failure to finish ahead of unfancied Barnsley in the automatic promotion places, and then subsequent play-off exit, caused owner Sir Jack Hayward to make an emotional outburst days after the campaign in which he accused manager Mark McGhee and the chairman, his son Jonathan, of "blackmailing" him into funding their high transfer spending. He promised that there would be an end to Wolves being a "sloppily-run club".

Results

Football League First Division

A total of 24 teams competed in the Football League First Division in the 1996–97 season. Each team played every other team twice: once at their stadium, and once at the opposition's. Three points were awarded to teams for each win, one point per draw, and none for defeats. Teams finishing level on points were firstly divided by the number of goals scored rather than goal difference.

The provisional fixture list was released on 17 June 1996, but was subject to change in the event of matches being selected for television coverage or police concerns.

Final table

Source: Statto.com

Results summary

Results by round

Play-offs

FA Cup

League Cup

Players

|-
|align="left"|||style="background:#faecc8" align="left"|  ‡
|0||0||0||0||0||0||0||0||0||0||
|-
|align="left"|||align="left"| 
|0||0||0||0||0||0||0||0||0||0||
|-
|align="left"|||align="left"| 
|0||0||0||0||0||0||0||0||0||0||
|-
|align="left"|||align="left"| 
|48||0||1||0||2||0||51||0||0||0||
|-
|align="left"|||align="left"|  (c)
|||2||0||0||0||0||style="background:#98FB98"|||2||0||0||
|-
|align="left"|||align="left"| 
|||0||0||0||0||0||||0||0||0||
|-
|align="left"|||align="left"|  †
|0||0||0||0||0||0||0||0||0||0||
|-
|align="left"|||align="left"| 
|0||0||0||0||0||0||0||0||0||0||
|-
|align="left"|||align="left"| 
|||0||0||0||0||0||||0||0||0||
|-
|align="left"|||align="left"| 
|||1||0||0||2||0||||1||0||0||
|-
|align="left"|||align="left"| 
|||0||0||0||1||0||style="background:#98FB98"|||0||0||0||
|-
|align="left"|||align="left"| 
|||1||1||0||||0||||1||0||0||
|-
|align="left"|||align="left"| 
|||2||0||0||2||0||||2||0||0||
|-
|align="left"|||align="left"| 
|||0||1||0||2||0||||0||0||0||
|-
|align="left"|||align="left"| 
|0||0||0||0||0||0||0||0||0||0||
|-
|align="left"|||align="left"| 
|||1||0||0||0||0||style="background:#98FB98"|||1||0||0||
|-
|align="left"|||align="left"| 
|||0||0||0||0||0||||0||0||0||
|-
|align="left"|||align="left"| 
|||5||1||0||2||0||||5||0||0||
|-
|align="left"|||align="left"| 
|||2||1||0||2||0||||2||0||0||
|-
|align="left"|||align="left"| 
|0||0||0||0||0||0||0||0||0||0||
|-
|align="left"|||align="left"| 
|||1||1||0||0||0||||1||0||0||
|-
|align="left"|||style="background:#faecc8" align="left"|  ‡
|||0||0||0||0||0||style="background:#98FB98"|||0||0||0||
|-
|align="left"|||align="left"| 
|||0||1||0||0||0||||0||0||0||
|-
|align="left"|||align="left"| 
|||3||||1||1||0||||4||0||1||
|-
|align="left"|||align="left"| 
|27||2||0||0||2||0||29||2||0||0||
|-
|align="left"|||align="left"| 
|||1||0||0||0||0||style="background:#98FB98"|||1||0||0||
|-
|align="left"|||align="left"| 
|||5||1||0||1||1||||6||0||0||
|-
|align="left"|||align="left"|  †
|0||0||0||0||0||0||0||0||0||0||
|-
|align="left"|||align="left"| 
|||0||0||0||0||0||||0||0||0||
|-
|align="left"|||align="left"| 
|||3||1||0||0||0||||3||0||0||
|-
|align="left"|||style="background:#faecc8" align="left"|  ‡
|||0||0||0||0||0||style="background:#98FB98"|||0||0||0||
|-
|align="left"|||align="left"| 
|||0||0||0||||0||||0||0||0||
|-
|align="left"|FW||align="left"| 
|45||23||1||0||2||0||48||23||0||1||
|-
|align="left"|FW||align="left"|  ¤
|||0||0||0||0||0||||0||0||0||
|-
|align="left"|FW||align="left"| 
|||1||0||0||0||0||||1||0||0||
|-
|align="left"|FW||align="left"| 
|||6||1||0||0||0||||6||0||0||
|-
|align="left"|FW||align="left"| 
|||0||0||0||0||0||||0||0||0||
|-
|align="left"|FW||align="left"| 
|||12||||0||2||0||style="background:#98FB98"|||12||0||0||
|}

Transfers

In

Out

Loans in

Loans out

Management and coaching staff

Kit
The season saw Puma take over as the club's kit manufacturer, and two new kits were therefore introduced. Both used a "wolf head" design to the shirts as a central feature, the home shirt using their traditional gold and black colours, while the away kit used shades of teal. In a further emphasis of the "wolf head", a new club emblen was introduced replacing the usage of the Wolverhampton city crest on the shirts that had been adopted for the previous three seasons. Both shirts featured the sponsor name of Goodyear.

References

1996-97
Wolverhampton Wanderers